Wiroj Lakkhanaadisorn (Thai: วิโรจน์ ลักขณาอดิศร) (born 11 December 1977) is a Thai politician who is the Move Forward Party candidate in the 2022 Bangkok gubernatorial election and a former party-list member of Thai house of representatives.

Biography and careers
Lakkhanaadisorn was born in the Bangkok's Yan Nawa area (now separated into Sathon district in 1989) as the eldest son in a middle-class family of Thai people of Chinese descent. He graduated from Wat Suthiwararam School in the native, with a bachelor's degree in engineering from Chulalongkorn University and graduated with a master's degree from the Faculty of Commerce and Accountancy, Chulalongkorn University.He also received a PhD in Economics from National Institute of Development Administration (NIDA).

Before entering the political circle, he used to be the Human Resources Director of SE-ED UCATION Public Company Limited, the largest bookstore in Thailand. 

He is best known as the "Council Star" for his fierce, heated debate.

In early 2022, he resigned as a party-list MP of the Move Forward Party, to launch as a candidate for the governor of Bangkok. Although not elected, but he received up to 253,938 votes (9.5%) for the third place.

References 

Living people
1977 births
Wiroj Lakkhanaadisorn
Wiroj Lakkhanaadisorn
Wiroj Lakkhanaadisorn
Wiroj Lakkhanaadisorn
Wiroj Lakkhanaadisorn
Wiroj Lakkhanaadisorn
Wiroj Lakkhanaadisorn